Saint-Zacharie (Provençal: Sant Jacariá) is a commune in the Var department in the Provence-Alpes-Côte d'Azur region in southeastern France.

Population

Points of interest
 Parc du Moulin Blanc
 Eglise saint-jean baptiste
 Château de Montvert
 The river Huveaune

Notable residents 
 Joseph Paul Gaimard (1793–1858), naval surgeon and naturalist, was born in Saint-Zacharie.
 Jean-Claude Gaudin, Mayor of Marseille.

See also
Communes of the Var department

References

Communes of Var (department)